The Battle of Ramu, fought in May 1824, was one of the opening battles of the First Anglo-Burmese War. On May 10, 1824, the Burmese under General Maha Bandula launched an invasion of Chittagong from Arakan as the southern part of a two-pronged attack aimed at Calcutta. They offered to end the invasion if the British were to hand over some Arakanese rebels that had taken refuge in the Bengal Presidency. The British commander at Ramu, Captain Noton (also spelled Cotton in some sources), rejected the offer, and the Burmese detachment under Lord Myawaddy Mingyi U Sa attacked. After three days of fighting the British troops, a mixed force with a total strength of several hundred men, was routed and forced from Ramu on May 17. The British losses in killed, wounded and missing amounted to more than half the strength of the garrison. The Burmese however failed to exploit their advantage, and Maha Bandula's army would withdraw to counter the British occupation of Rangoon.

Campaign background 
In 1824, the Burmese armies marched into the Bengal Presidency to force the British into surrendering Arakanese rebels taking shelter. Maha Bandula, was supported by twelve of the Burmese best divisions, including one under his personal command, all totaling 10,000 men and 500 horses. Bandula's plan was to attack the British on two fronts: Chittagong from Arakan in the southeast, and Sylhet from Cachar and Jaintia in the north. Bandula personally commanded the Arakan theatre while Thado Thiri Maha Uzana commanded Cachar and Jaintia theater.

British forces in Chittagong under Colonel Shapland consists of around 3,000 men from 13th Bengal Native infantry, 5 companies of the 2nd battalion 20th Native infantry, 1st battalion of the 23rd Native Infantry and a local corps of Arakanese levies.

Early in the war, British forces were pushed back by the battle-hardened Burmese due to the difficulties of fighting in the jungles of Manipur and Assam.

While Bandula remained in Arakan, a 4,000 strong Burmese force under the Lord Myawaddy, advanced into Chittagong. According to G.P. Ramachandra, the Burmese made several efforts to make peaceful contact.

According to a British witness:"Captain Noton [the British commander] communicated with two horsemen who approached the opposite bank of the river, who disavowed any hostile intention of the Burmese towards us, but desired only that some rebellious subjects under our protection should be delivered up to them offering at the same time to explain further the views of the Burmese, provided Captain Noton would allow them to cross the river with a guard of 100 horsemen and guarantee the safety of that party."Noton did not trust the Burmese and rejected the offer. It appears that the British were the first to open fire:

"On the evening of the 14th, the enemy's whole force is concentrated on the opposite bank of the river apparently with the intention of crossing at                                  a favourable opportunity [some units] were detached for the purpose of annoying the enemy on their Encampment, and preventing them crossing the river, should they attempt it. Several rounds of grape and shrapnel were fired from the nine-pounders with effect,  and appeared to create much confusion."

The Burmese then proceeded to attack the British force occupying Ratnapallang, fourteen miles south of Ramu. Captain Noton, commanding from Ramu, decided to attack the Burmese position, leaving the convalescents of the 1/23rd, the whole of the Provincials, and around a hundred levy, he marched out of Ramu on the evening of 11 May with the rest of his detachment, including the two 6-pounder guns.

The British found the Burmese occupying the hills overlooking the road on the east side and built a stockade at Ratnapallang. While Captain Noton was able to advance past these hills towards the stockade, they experienced difficulty in bringing up the guns due to the inexperience of the mahouts who drove the elephants.

The British exchanged fire all night around the stockade but were forced to withdraw in the morning due to the ammunition coolies deserting and the guns thus being unserviceable. Noton withdrew to back to Ramu, with a loss of seven missing and eleven wounded. He was reinforced joined by three companies of the 2nd battalion of the 20th Bengal Native Infantry.

Forces 
The British forces consisted of around 350 regulars: five companies from the 1st Battalion of the 23rd Bengal Native Infantry, three companies from the 2nd Battalion, 20th Bengal Native Infantry, 250  men from the Chittagong Provincial Battalion and about 400 Maghs (Arakanese) Levies. Noton also had under his command two 6-pounder guns.

The Burmese army left the capital with 4,000 and gathered levies along the way gathering up to a total of around 10,000 by the time they reach Arakan. The British estimated at least 10,000 infantry and 200 cavalrymen at Ramu, however, actual numbers are likely lower as the Burmese forces split into several columns under Myawaddy Mingyi U Sa, Uzana and Maha Bandula himself. Furthermore, the British regarded much of the intelligence gathered on Burma to be inadequate and unreliable.

Battle 
On the 13th morning, Myawaddy's forces had been reinforced and encouraged by their success, advanced from their stockade in Ratnapallang and occupied the hills east of Ramu across the river which flows by the town. Despite the disparity in strength, Noton resolved to hold Ramu, for he was confident that further reinforcements would arrive from Chittagong.

During 14 May, the two 6-pounder guns managed to prevent the Burmese from crossing the river, but on the 15th they managed to cross the stream, and took possession of a tank near British position. The encampment was surrounded by a three-foot levee and was protected on its right flank by the river; some sixty feet right flank was another tank, which was held by a rear was also a tank, held by a strong unit of Provincials. The Burmese infantry made good use of natural cover and despite heavy fire proceeded to occupy the tank in front without difficulties. In the next two days, Burmese entrenched themselves closer and closer to the British lines despite heavy fire. The levies and Provincials at this point were greatly demoralized and were barely prevented from deserting.

Captain Noton began to consider withdrawing but he had received information leading him to believe that reinforcements would arrive from Chittagong next day, and chose to hold his ground. Skirmishing continued all night but by the next morning, the Burmese positions had been reinforced and were entrenched within thirty yards of the British pickets at the tank.

As the Burmese began to close in, the levies and Provincials fled along with the elephants from the gunnery teams leaving the regulars severely outnumbered and without artillery support. Noton, with only 400 exhausted men attempted to retreat before the Burmese could attack. They managed to maintain order for about half a mile before being finally caught up by the Burmese cavalry, who charged and routed the remaining British troops.

Wilson describes the closing stage of the battle as:"(A) small body of Horse attached to their force, by whom the men that fell off from the main body were instantly cut to pieces, filled (our) troops with an ungovernable panic, which rendered the exertions of their officers to preserve order unavailing."

Aftermath

Casualties 
The British force suffered around 250 killed, wounded or captured. Among the six European and three Indian officers, only three survived with two being wounded. The six officers were Captains Trueman, Pringles, and Noton himself, Lieutenant Grigg, Ensign Bennet, and Assistant-surgeon Maysmore were killed. Lieutenants Scott and Campbell were wounded while Lieutenant Codrington escaped. The British force at Ramu had been thoroughly destroyed with British prisoners being marched back to Ava. The British considered their operations in the Chittagong frontier "unsatisfactory throughout" with little knowledge of the terrain, sickness being prevalent, difficulties in logistics and lack of friendly locals.

The Burmese losses were unknown but were suspected to suffer at most 200 killed or wounded most of them from the British artillery. The Burmese commander at Ramu, Myawaddy, however, witnessed the firepower of British regulars and would at that point attempt to avoid engaging them in open combat.

Myawaddy's column then joined Bandula's column on the march to defeat British forces at Gadawpalin, and went on to capture Cox's Bazar. The destruction at Ramu caused extreme panic in Chittagong and in Calcutta. The Burmese victory too contributed to the Barrackpore mutiny of 1824 where tales of mystical prowess of the Burmese was exaggerated. However Bandula, not wanting to overstretch his lines, stopped Myawaddy from proceeding to Chittagong even though it was lightly held. Had the Burmese taken it, it would open the way to Calcutta. A threat to Calcutta could have potentially forced the British into giving more favourable terms in the peace negotiations to the Burmese kingdom or at least contribute more troops on the Arakan frontier rather than to Rangoon.

Furthermore, the British occupation of Rangoon and naval assault forced the offensive to halt and return to Burma. Myawaddy and his veterans would return to Arakan while Bandula brought the rest of his men back to Rangoon to face the 11,000 strong expeditionary force under Sir Archibald Campbell.

The British would later return to Arakan with a much larger army of 10,000 men including two Royal regiments, cavalry and thirty artillery pieces led by high profiled officers such as War of 1812 veteran Joseph Wanton Morrison and Colquhoun Grant. Although the British would finally defeat Myawaddy and his depleted men in the Battle of Mrauk U on April 1, 1825, Morrison and many of his men suffered greatly from tropical diseases.

References 

First Anglo-Burmese War
Military history of Myanmar
Battles involving the United Kingdom
Battles involving British India
Battles involving the British East India Company
Battles involving Myanmar
1824 in Asia